Christian Herrera (born April 20, 1997) is a professional footballer who plays as a goalkeeper for USL Championship club  Colorado Springs Switchbacks. Born in the United States, he represented the Mexico national under-20 team.

Career
Herrera began his career with United Soccer League side Real Monarchs after playing with the academy team of Real Salt Lake in Arizona. He had spells on loan with C.F. Pachuca and Portland Timbers 2, before signing permanently with Swope Park Rangers on February 26, 2018. Herrera was released by Swope Park on December 3, 2018.

Herrera joined USL League One side Orlando City B in February 2019. After one season in Orlando, Herrera joined NISA club Oakland Roots in February 2020.

On February 3, 2022, Herrera signed with Colorado Springs Switchbacks of the USL Championship.

References

External links
 
 Christian Herrera at NISA
 

1997 births
Living people
Sportspeople from Las Cruces, New Mexico
Soccer players from New Mexico
Mexican footballers
Mexico youth international footballers
American soccer players
United States men's youth international soccer players
American sportspeople of Mexican descent
Association football goalkeepers
Orlando City B players
Portland Timbers 2 players
Real Monarchs players
Sporting Kansas City II players
Tacoma Defiance players
Oakland Roots SC players
Colorado Springs Switchbacks FC players
USL Championship players
USL League One players
National Independent Soccer Association players